Pradeep Bastola(Nepali: प्रदिप बास्तोला; born 1990) is a Nepali actor.

Career 
Bastola born on 1990 he started his acting career in 2009 from a television series college which was telecasted on Kantipur TV. He is very well known for his movies "Adhakatti (2015)" and "Subha Love(2019)." He has acted in numerous music videos like "Sachikai ho ki khyal khyalma,""Lutnu raicha," "Aajako Yo Saanjh," "Jhilmil jhilmil," "Saila Maya Nalaam Bho," "Pipal chautari" etc. Theatre framas like "Ashwet (2018)" and "Darpan (2019)," has proven his prominent acting abilities to the audience. Bastola has also hosted the reality TV show "Boogie Woogie.  He has worked in the movies like Kollywood (2012), Love you baba (2014), Katha Kathmandu (2018) etc.

Awards

References 

Living people
1990 births